Gaël Assumani (born 29 March 2000) is a Congolese boxer who crowned champion of the Democratic Republic of Congo lightweight in 2020 and 2021.

Biography 
Gaël Assumani was born on March 29, 2000 in Nyakunde, located southwest of Bunia, in the territory of Irumu. He becomes Democratic Republic of Congo lightweight champion on November 28, 2020, after his victory against Abass Habamungu from South Kivu and once again, he won this title in the ring in June 2021 in Goma, after five rounds of perfect equality and sanctioned by huge blows on both sides by K.O, against Sylvain Muhindo.

References

External links 

2000 births
Living people
Sportspeople from Goma
Middleweight boxers
Democratic Republic of the Congo male boxers
21st-century Democratic Republic of the Congo people